Edwin Moon Cummings (29 January 1885 – 22 November 1951) was a New Zealand cricketer. He played two first-class matches for Otago between 1909 and 1911.

Cummings was born at Dunedin in 1885. He worked as a timber merchant. His older brother George Cummings also played for Otago.

References

External links
 

1885 births
1951 deaths
New Zealand cricketers
Otago cricketers
Cricketers from Dunedin